KPP may refer to:

Communist Party of Poland
Fisher's equation, also known as the Kolmogorov–Petrovsky–Piskunov equation.
Kai Pearce-Paul, rugby league player
Kamerun People's Party
Kentucky Proud Park, a baseball stadium in Lexington, Kentucky, USA (University of Kentucky)
Kernel Patch Protection, a security feature of Microsoft Windows
Key Performance Parameters, convey critical performance goals in JCIDS
Kinetic PreProcessor, an open-source software tool used in atmospheric chemistry
Korean Patriots Party, a political party in the Republic of Korea (South Korea), right-wing conservatives  
Kyary Pamyu Pamyu, a Japanese female singer.